Epiglaea decliva, the sloping sallow moth, is a moth of the family Noctuidae. It is found in North America, where it has been recorded from Quebec and Maine to South Carolina, west to Kansas and north to Alberta. The habitat consists of barrens, thickets, woodlots and forests.

The wingspan is 40–50 mm. The forewings range from orangish to reddish-brown or purplish-brown. The reniform and orbicular spots are filled with a slightly darker colour, and have a pale outline. The hindwings are dirty brownish-grey with wavy red terminal line. Adults are on wing from October to December in one generation per year.

The larvae feed on the leaves of Malus, Prunus and Quercus species. They have a brown to reddish-brown body and a mottled black head. They reach a length of 50 mm when full-grown. The larvae can be found from May to July. The species overwinters as an egg.

References

Cuculliinae
Moths described in 1874
Moths of North America